Trapania circinata is a species of sea slug, a dorid nudibranch, a marine gastropod mollusc in the family Goniodorididae.

Distribution
This species was first described from the Marshall Islands.

Description
This goniodorid nudibranch is translucent white in colour. The oral tentacles and rhinophores are black and the lateral papillae and gills are translucent with black spots.

Ecology
Trapania circinata probably feeds on Entoprocta which often grow on sponges and other living substrata.

References

Goniodorididae
Gastropods described in 2008